Plasmodium matutinum is a parasite of the genus Plasmodium subgenus Haemamoeba.

Like all Plasmodium species P. matutinum has both vertebrate and insect hosts. The vertebrate hosts for this parasite are birds.

Taxonomy 

The parasite was first described by Huff in 1937.

For some time this species was thought to be a subspecies of Plasmodium relictum.

Hosts

This species infects the thrush nightingale (Luscinia luscinia).

References 

lutzi
Parasites of birds